Anal hygiene or anal cleansing refers to hygienic practices that are performed on a person's anus, usually shortly after defecation. Post-defecation cleansing is rarely discussed academically, partly due to the social taboo. The scientific objective of post-defecation cleansing is to prevent exposure to pathogens<with water or wiping the area with dry materials such as toilet paper. In water-based cleansing, either a hand is used for rubbing the area while rinsing it with the aid of running water or (in bidet systems) pressurized water is used. In either method subsequent hand sanitization is essential to achieve the ultimate objectives of post-defecation cleansing.

History 

Ancient Greeks were known to use fragments of ceramic known as pessoi to perform anal cleansing.

Roman anal cleansing was done with a sponge on a stick called a tersorium. The stick would be soaked in a water channel in front of a toilet, and then stuck through the hole built into the front of the toilet for anal cleaning. The tersorium was shared by people using public latrines. To clean the sponge, they washed it in a bucket with water and salt or vinegar. This became a breeding ground for bacteria, causing the spread of disease in the latrine.

In ancient Japan, a wooden skewer known as chuugi ("shit sticks") was used for cleaning after defecation.

The use of toilet paper for post-defecation cleansing first started in China in the 2nd century BC. According to Charlier (2012) French novelist (and physician) François Rabelais had argued about the ineffectiveness of toilet paper in the 16th century. The first commercially available toilet paper was invented by Joseph Gayetty, a New York entrepreneur, in 1857 with the dawning of the second industrial revolution.

Cultural preferences  

In predominantly Catholic countries, Eastern Orthodox, Hindu, Buddhist and Muslim cultures, and in some Protestant countries such as  Finland, as well as in Southeast Asia and Southern Europe and Latin America, water is usually used for anal cleansing, using a jet (bidet shower, bidet) or vessel (lota, aftabeh), and a person's hand (in some places only the left hand is used). Cleaning with water is sometimes followed by drying the anal region and hand with a cloth towel or toilet paper. On the other hand, in some parts of developing countries and during camping trips, materials such as vegetable matter (leaves), mudballs, snow (water), corncobs, and stones are sometimes used for anal cleansing. Having hygienic means for anal cleansing available at the toilet or site of defecation is important for overall public health. The absence of proper materials in households can, under some circumstances, be correlated to the number of diarrhea episodes per household. The history of anal hygiene, from ancient Rome and Greece to China and Japan, involves sponges and sticks as well as water and paper.

The inclusion of anal cleansing facilities is often overlooked when designing public or shared toilets in developing countries. In most cases, materials for anal cleansing are not made available within those facilities. Ensuring safe disposal of anal cleansing materials is often overlooked, which can lead to unhygienic debris inside or surrounding public toilets that contributes to the spread of diseases.

Post-defecation facilities evolved with human civilization, thus, post-defecation cleansing. According to Fernando  there are Sri Lankan archeological evidences of toilet use ranging from 936 AD at Pamsukulika monastery in Ritigala, sixth century Abhayagiri complex in Anuradhapura and at the Baddhasimapasada and the Alahana Pirivena hospital complex in Polonnaruwa to 12th century hospital toilet in Mihintale. These toilets were found to be with a complete system of plumbing and sewage with multistage treatment plants. According to Buddhism, toilet etiquettes (Wachchakutti Wattakkandaka in Pali language) were enumerated by Buddhas himself in Tripitaka (Three baskets), also known as Pali Canon, the earliest collection of Buddhist teachings.

Common methods

Water

Water with soap cleansing is a reliable and hygienic way of removing fecal remnants.

Muslim societies 

The use of water in Muslim countries is due in part to Islamic toilet etiquette which encourages washing after all instances of defecation. There are flexible provisions for when water is scarce: stones or papers can be used for cleansing after defecation instead.

In Turkey, all Western-style toilets have a small nozzle on the centre rear of the toilet rim aiming at the anus. This nozzle is called taharet musluğu and it is controlled by a small tap placed within hand's reach near the toilet. It is used to wash the anus after wiping and drying with toilet paper. Squat toilets in Turkey do not have this kind of nozzle (a small bucket of water from a hand's reach tap or a bidet shower is used instead).

Another alternative resembles a miniature shower and is known as a "health faucet", bidet shower, or "bum gun". It is commonly found to the right of the toilet where it is easy to reach. These are commonly used in the Muslim world. In the Indian subcontinent, a lota vessel is often used to cleanse with water, though the shower or nozzle is common among new toilets.

Indian subcontinent 
In India and the Indian subcontinent, over 95% of the population use water for cleansing the anal area after defecating. The cleaning of hands with soap/ liquid soap after this cleansing process is very important. In urban areas and newer settlements, bidet showers are widely used. Simpler toilet rooms or toilets in places without constant supply of running water generally use a lota or a mug along with buckets, and bails for storage of water and for the purpose of cleaning.

Southeast Asia 

In Southeast Asian countries such as Indonesia, the Philippines,  Thailand, Brunei, Malaysia, and East Timor, house bathrooms usually have a medium size wide plastic dipper (called gayung in Indonesia, tabo in the Philippines, ขัน (khan) in Thai) or large cup, which is also used in bathing. In Thailand, the "bum gun" is ubiquitous. Some health faucets are metal sets attached to the bowl of the water closet, with the opening pointed at the anus. Toilets in public establishments mainly provide toilet paper for free or dispensed, though the dipper (often a cut up plastic bottle or small jug) is occasionally encountered in some establishments.  Owing to its ethnic diversity, restrooms in Malaysia often feature a combination of anal cleansing methods where most public restrooms in cities offer toilet paper as well as a built in bidet or a small hand-held bidet shower (health faucets) connected to the plumbing in the absence of a built-in bidet.

In Vietnam, people often use a bidet shower. It is usually available both at general households and public places.

East Asia

The first "paperless" toilet seat was invented in Japan in 1980. A spray toilet seat, commonly known by Toto's trademark Washlet, is typically a combination of seat warmer, bidet and drier, controlled by an electronic panel or remote control next to the toilet seat. A nozzle placed at rear of the toilet bowl aims a water jet to the anus and serves the purpose of cleaning. Many models have a separate "bidet" function aimed towards the front for feminine cleansing. The spray toilet seat is common only in Western-style toilets, and is not incorporated in traditional style squat toilets. Some modern Japanese bidet toilets, especially in hotels and public areas, are labeled with pictograms to avoid language problems, and most newer models have a sensor that will refuse to activate the bidet unless someone is sitting on the toilet.

Europe and the Americas 

The use of water in many Christian countries is due in part to the biblical toilet etiquette which encourages washing after all instances of defecation. The bidet is common in predominantly Catholic countries where water is considered essential for anal cleansing. 

Some people in Europe and the Americas use bidets for anal cleansing with water. Bidets are common bathroom fixtures in many Western and Southern European countries and many South American countries, while bidet showers are more common in Finland and Greece. The availability of bidets varies widely within this group of countries. Furthermore, even where bidets exist, they may have other uses than for anal washing. In Italy, the installation of bidets in every household and hotel became mandatory by law on July 5, 1975.

Toilet paper 

In some cultures—such as many Western countries—cleaning after defecation is generally done with toilet paper only, until the person can bathe or shower. Toilet paper is considered a very important household commodity in Western culture, as illustrated by the panic buying of toilet paper in many Western countries during the COVID-19 pandemic.

In some parts of the world, especially before toilet paper was available or affordable, the use of newspaper, telephone directory pages, or other paper products was common. In North America, the widely distributed Sears Roebuck catalog was also a popular choice until it began to be printed on glossy paper (at which point some people wrote to the company to complain). With flush toilets, using newspaper as toilet paper is likely to cause blockages.

This practice continues today in parts of Africa; while rolls of toilet paper are readily available, they can be fairly expensive, prompting poorer members of the community to use newspapers.

People suffering from hemorrhoids may find it more difficult to keep the anal area clean using only toilet paper and may prefer washing with water as well.

Although wiping from front to back minimizes the risk of contaminating the urethra, the directionality of wiping varies based on sex, personal preference, and culture.

Some people wipe their anal region standing while others wipe theirs sitting.

Other methods and materials

Wet wipes and gel wipes 
When cleaning babies' buttocks during diaper changes wet wipes are often used, in combination with water if available. As wet wipes are produced from plastic textiles made of polyester or polypropylene, they are notoriously bad for sewage systems as they do not decompose, although the wet wipe industry maintains they are biodegradable but not "flushable".

A product of the 21st century, special foams, sprays and gels can be combined with dry toilet paper as alternatives to wet wipes. A moisturizing gel can be applied to toilet paper for personal hygiene or to reduce skin irritation from diarrhea. This product is called gel wipe.

Prewipes 
Novel pre-wipes and methods are disclosed for assisting in the cleaning of skin in the anal area. The pre-wipes comprise an anti-adherent formulation and are wiped across the anal region of a user prior to defecation to introduce a film of the anti-adherent formulation onto the anal region. This film reduces the amount of fecal material that is retained in the anal region after defecation and reduces the amount of cleanup required. This reduced amount of cleanup results in cleaner, healthier skin.

Natural materials 
Stones, leaves, corn cobs and similar natural materials may also be used for anal cleansing.

References

Defecation
Hygiene